Leontius, Archbishop of Lyon was a son of St. Rusticus, with St. Rusticus also being Archbishop of Lyon preceding Leontius. 

In turn, Leontius acted as Archbishop in the 540s (AD).

Archbishops of Lyon